The men's 60 metres hurdles competition at the 2010 IAAF World Indoor Championships was held at the ASPIRE Dome on 12 and 14 March.

The competition was set to be one of the highlights of the competition from the very beginning: it was the first major competition for 2004 Olympic champion Liu Xiang's after a long period out through injury and it was the first time that he, Dayron Robles and Terrence Trammell – the best of their generation – had faced each other since the 2007 World Championships.

Only ten athletes were eliminated in the first round in which American hurdlers David Oliver and Trammell ran the fastest times. The majority of athletes gave conservative performances and Ladji Doucouré of France (a former world champion) was the only unexpected elimination, as he suffered an injury at the beginning of heat four. The no false-start rule claimed two victims in the first semi-final in which Liu and Trammell progressed. Former European Indoor champion Gregory Sedoc was eliminated in the second of the three semis while Petr Svoboda won the last semi-final; all the favourites progressed to the final.

The final turned into a head-to-head between Trammell and Robles, with the Cuban pulling alongside the American in the latter part of the race and dipping at the line for the victory. In spite of a slow reaction time, Robles ran a Championships record of 7.34 seconds to win his first indoor title. A perennial silver medallist outdoors, Trammell equalled the American record of 7.36 seconds for another silver, although his time would have been enough for the gold at any of the 12 championships preceding this edition. Oliver ran a personal best of 7.44 seconds to take the bronze while Liu finished in seventh, clearly lacking complete race fitness.

Medalists

Records

Qualification standards

Schedule

Results

Heats

Qualification: First 4 in each heat (Q) and the next 4 fastest (q) advance to the semifinals.

Semifinals

Qualification: First 2 in each heat (Q) and the next 2 fastest (q) advance to the final.

Final

References

Heats Results
Semifinals Results
Final Result

60 metres hurdles
60 metres hurdles at the World Athletics Indoor Championships